What are termed round barns include historic barns having true circular designs and also octagonal or other polygonal designs that approximate a circle.  In the United States, in a first era of round barn construction, from 1850 to 1900, numerous octagonal barns were built.  In a second era, from 1889 to 1936, numerous true circular barns were built.

This list article includes surviving or historic round barns in Canada, the United States, and elsewhere. There were 19 historic round and polygonal barns in Canada identified as surviving in the 1970s, in a list compiled by members of a club and typed up by Katherine Kirkam.  According to Matthew Farfan, nine round barns survive in the Eastern Townships of the province of Quebec, all close to the U.S. border.

Besides paying attention to Canadian barns, Kirkham also studied American barns; in the 1970s, she identified 444 surviving barns in the United States.  Many of them are listed on the National Register of Historic Places.

Dale J. Travis has identified and photographed (or collected photos of) round barns and other round or polygonal buildings throughout the United States and Canada. His webpages document the loss of numerous historic round barns.

The periods during which round barns were built varies across U.S. states. Most of Indiana's round barns were built between 1900 and 1920, and their construction peaked in 1910. Iowa's peak years were from 1909 to 1922. All 44 of the historic round barns built in South Dakota were built between 1903 and 1946. North Dakota's peak years were from 1910 to 1916. South Dakota had none built before 1900 because the state had yet to be developed.

Canada
As documented here, there are at least 11 surviving octagonal, true round, and other round-type barns in Quebec.  A few others survive in British Columbia, Alberta and Ontario.  A list of round or near-round structures in Quebec, including historic round barns, developed by Dale J. Travis has informed this compilation.  Similar for other provinces at Travis site. Travis also includes less historic structures.

This includes others not in Travis's compilation, such as the Higginson Round Barn, which is an impressive and old one.

Following is incomplete, but is intended to become a complete list, from West to East:

United States

West: California, Oregon, Washington, New Mexico, Colorado

Central

Illinois
See Round Barns in Illinois Thematic Resources for a discussion of current and former round barns in the state.

Indiana

Iowa

Kentucky

North Dakota

Ohio

South Dakota

Wisconsin

Kansas, Minnesota, Montana, Nebraska, Oklahoma
Numerous round and octagon barns in Kansas, including some already- or since-destroyed ones, are covered in a 1999 Kansas State Historical Society study. Round barns in Kansas and these other states include:

Mid-Atlantic

Delaware and Pennsylvania

New York

NY notes
Gamel hexadecagon barn 16-sided Gamel barn in North Collins, New York

Schultz 15-sided barn (1918–1929) at Cohecton not listed due to DOE owner objection

"Nine octagonal barns, most built in the 1870s and 1880s, have been noted in New York, and undoubtedly many more have never been recorded. Extant examples in the nominated group include the Baker octagon barn near Richfield Springs (1882), the Lunn-Musser octagon barn in New Lisbon (1885), and the Lattin-Crandall octagon barn in Catharine (1893)."

McArthur-Martin barn in Kortright (1883) 16-sided

Parker 13-sided barn (1896) about 15 miles north of Kortright in Jefterson

"Roof types among the nominated examples include conical (for example the Schultz 15-sided barn at Cochecton, New York (1918), gambrel. (the Young round barn at Greene-1914), and domical (Bates barn at Greene)."

11 of 12 listed, p21

New England

Massachusetts, New Hampshire

Vermont

South: Georgia, Missouri, West Virginia and Virginia

South America

Europe

Notes

References